is a railway station on the Keio Line in Setagaya, Tokyo, Japan, operated by the private railway operator Keio Corporation.

Station layout
The station consists of two ground-level island platforms serving four tracks.

Platforms

History
Sakurajōsui Station opened on 25 April 1926.

References

Keio Line
Stations of Keio Corporation
Railway stations in Tokyo
Railway stations in Japan opened in 1926